The Noolands are a Canadian alternative / folk band from Barrie, Ontario. Founded in 2014 by longtime friends Aaron Casey, Brandon Davenport, and twin brothers Jon Laxton and James Laxton, the group describes itself as "a rock & roll band that writes and records music for our best friends." The band has historically released their work under their own independent label.

Releases
To date, The Noolands have released five singles and two EPs. Their first two singles, End of the Road and High School T-Shirt, were released in 2014, shortly after the formation of the band. After releasing their subsequent first EP and two additional singles, the band released their second EP, Us on a Bus, in 2018 which garnered success in Canada and the United States.

Their latest single, Grenadine, was released in 2019 and features all current members of the band, including newest member Peter Meers on saxophone. The Noolands describe the style of Grenadine as rock "with a touch of gypsy soul." The song was recorded and mixed by Daryl Sarnat at Mix11 Studios and mastered by Noah Mintz at Lacquer Channel Mastering.

Recognition
The band often performs at local venues and events such as Celebrate Barrie and the Barrie Art Awards. The Noolands' songs Loosey Goosey and Nine to Five (from their Us on a Bus EP) have been played on radio stations in the United States and Canada, including Rock 95. Several of the group's songs have been featured on Spotify.

Roxodus music festival
In 2019, the band was invited to perform at a planned, high-profile summer music festival in Ontario known as Roxodus along with Aerosmith, Lynyrd Skynyrd, Nickelback, and other well-known rock groups. However, the festival was cancelled on July 3rd, 2019, just days before it was scheduled to take place.

Current members
Aaron Casey: Vocals/drums/guitar/piano
Brandon Davenport: Drums/vocals/piano
James Laxton: Guitar/piano/drums
Jon Laxton: Bass
Peter Meers: Saxophone

Discography

References

External links
The Noolands (official homepage)

Musical groups from Barrie
Canadian rock music groups
Canadian folk music groups
Musical groups established in 2014
2014 establishments in Ontario